Gentium (from the Latin for "of the nations") is a Unicode serif typeface designed by Victor Gaultney. Gentium fonts are free and open source software, and are released under the SIL Open Font License (OFL), which permits modification and redistribution. Gentium has wide support for languages using the Latin, Greek, and Cyrillic alphabets, and the International Phonetic Alphabet (IPA). Gentium Plus variants released since November 2010 now include over 5,500 glyphs and advanced typographic features through OpenType and formerly Graphite.

History and variants

Gentium and GentiumAlt
The original release of Gentium defined roughly 1,500 glyphs covering almost all of the range of Latin characters used worldwide, as well as monotonic and polytonic Greek, designed to flow in harmony with the Latin. Gentium comes with a variant called GentiumAlt ("Gentium Alternative"), which contains flatter diacritics intended to improve the appearance of letters with multiple diacritics, as well as a glyph variant of the Greek circumflex that resembles an inverted breve.

In 2003, the Gentium font was awarded a Certificate of Excellence in Type Design from the Association Typographique Internationale (ATypI) as one of the best designs of the previous five years.

Gentium Basic fonts
In November 2007, the Gentium Basic and Gentium Book Basic fonts were released, containing Gentium fonts in four faces: regular, italic, bold, and bold italic. Gentium Basic has the same weight as the previous Gentium fonts, while Gentium Book Basic is set at a slightly heavier weight for use in publishing books at small point sizes, or under certain printing conditions. While these fonts contain bold and bold italic variants, they do not contain the full range of glyphs, especially most Greek letters. These fonts are said to be in beta testing and are intended to provide a boldface weight for general applications in the interim while the full bold and bold italic character set is developed.

Gentium Plus fonts
An updated version of the roman and italic fonts called Gentium Plus, which includes the full extended Latin, IPA, Greek, and Cyrillic coverage, was released in November 2010. Gentium Plus variants containing an additional 3,800 glyphs, including Cyrillic and additional coverage of the IPA, were added in 2010 in a release called Gentium Plus. Released shortly afterward was a variant called "Gentium Plus Compact", which has compact spacing for aesthetic reasons. Both Gentium Plus and Gentium Plus Compact include regular and italic variants of over 5500 glyphs.

Since the initial release of the Gentium Plus fonts, the focus of the project has shifted to completing bold and bold italic weights of the Gentium Plus family, as well as the creation of a "Gentium Book Plus" family with a slightly heavier weight which may be useful at small sizes. These are the weights that are currently available in the Gentium Basic and Gentium Book Basic fonts.

Custom character variants

Variant forms of many characters can be chosen in the word-processor. For example, for primer-style 'a' and 'g', append ss01=1 to the name of the font in the font-selection window. (Features are appended with a colon and linked with an ampersand – see images at right.) Alternatively, customized versions of the fonts can be created with TypeTuner, prior to download, that have those forms preset. 

Features that may be chosen include small capitals, primer-style 'a' and 'g', roman-style 'a' and 'g' in italic typeface, variant forms of capital 'Ŋ', large modifier letter apostrophe and saltillo, Vietnamese-style diacritics, Serbian-style italics (in Cyrillic), staveless tone letters, and automatic fractions.

Open source development 
The ongoing development of the font welcomes contributions from its users.
Gentium was released under the Open Font License on November 28, 2005.  Older typefaces that support the same character inventory, and also released under the OFL, are Charis SIL and Doulos SIL.

See also 
 Free software Unicode typefaces

References

External links

Gentium — a typeface for the nations
SIL Open Font License (OFL)
Gentium for LaTeX: package
TypeTuner Web homepage

Old style serif typefaces
Free software Unicode typefaces
Greek typefaces
Typefaces and fonts introduced in 2001